Tumi Aahibaane is a 2017 Indian Assamese language musical romance film directed by Prerana Barbarooah and jointly produced by ASFFDC & Bibi Devi Barbarooah under the banner of Prerana Creations. The film stars Ravi Sarma and Barsha Rani Bishaya in lead role and Gunjan Bhardwaj and Moonmi Phukan in Supporting role.

Cast

 Ravi Sarma as Nibir 
 Barsha Rani Bishaya as Birina
 Gunjan Bhardwaj as Wasim
 Moonmi Phukan as Shayesha
 Nipon Goswami as Nana, Haren kaiti and Dodaideu
 Saurabh Hazarika as Anjan
 Bibhutibhusan Hazarika as Jeet
 Madhusmita Saikia as Shabana
 Arun Nath as Karim
 Nilutpal Barua as Sultan
 Tarulata Kutum
 Madhurima Chowdhury
 Priyanka Boruah

Soundtrack

The music of the film was released in The Grand Music Launch held aboard AlFresco Grand Cruse on the Brahmaputra on 21 May 2017. The songs composed by Tarali Sarma are now available on all leading music apps across 250+ countries. songs are sung by Zubeen Garg, Tarali Sarma and new debut singer Akhu.

Track listing

References

External links 

 

 

2017 films
2010s Assamese-language films